Dazzling Mirage is a 2014 Nigerian drama film, produced and directed by Tunde Kelani; it stars Kemi "Lala" Akindoju, Kunle Afolayan, Bimbo Manuel, Yomi Fash Lanso, Taiwo Ajai-Lycett and Seun Akindele. It also features special appearances from Adewale Ayuba, Sean Tizzle, Tunde Babalola and Steve Sodiya. The film is an adaptation of a novel of the same name by Olayinka Abimbola Egbokhare, adapted to screen by Ade Solanke. It tells the story of a young sickle-cell patient and the various social and emotional challenges she is faced with.

Cast
 Kemi 'Lala' Akindoju as Funmiwo
 Seun Akindele as Sanya
 Kunle Afolayan as Dotun
 Taiwo Ajai-Lycett as Sanya's Mum
 Bimbo Manuel as Funmiwo's Dad
 Yomi Fash Lanso as Lanre
 Carol King as Funmiwo's Mum
 Khabirat Kafidipe as Tade
 Aderounmu Adejumoke as Yejide
 Bukola Awoyemi as
 Ayo Badmus as
 Adewale Ayuba as Adewale Ayuba (special appearance)
 Sean Tizzle as Sean Tizzle (special appearance)
 Collins Enebeli as
 Tunde Babalola as
 Hakeem Adenekan as
 Steve Sodiya as

Production
It was announced in March 2012, just after the theatrical release of Maami, that Kelani would be adapting Olayinka Abimbola's Dazzling Mirage to the big screen. As of January 2013, the adaptation was confirmed to have commenced. Kelani believes the film to be his way of contributing towards public awareness of genotype-related issues like Sickle-Cell Anaemia, hoping young couples would pay attention to its importance. He states: "all of us are connected directly or indirectly to the sufferers of this ailment" "I have also had personal relationships with sufferers of this ailment and I consider it my responsibility to bring their story to fore." Kemi Akindoju had her screen test on 12 June 2013 and principal photography commenced on 18 September 2013.

Release
A promotional poster of Dazzling Mirage was unveiled on 24 June 2013; Onset pictures were also constantly released to the public during the course of filming. The first trailer for the film was released to the public on 1 December 2013 and a second trailer was released on 14 February 2014. The first official poster, together with a third trailer was released on 18 June 2014, ahead of the 2014 World Sickle-cell Awareness Day. The film screened at the Nollywood Film Festival in New Zealand; it premiered on 7 November 2014 at the Muson Centre, Lagos, and was generally released theatrically on 20 February 2015.

Accolades
Dazzling Mirage has been nominated in the "Best Costume Design" category at the 2015 Africa Magic Viewers Choice Awards.

See also
 Sickle-cell anaemia

References

External links

2014 films
English-language Nigerian films
Films about diseases
Films shot in Lagos
2014 romantic drama films
Nigerian romantic drama films
Films set in Lagos
Films directed by Tunde Kelani
Films based on Nigerian novels
2010s English-language films